The Presentation at the Temple  is a painting by the Italian Renaissance artist Andrea Mantegna.  Dating to c. 1455, it is housed in the Gemäldegalerie, Berlin, Germany.

History
The date of the painting is unknown, but it belongs to the painter's youth in Padua. Date ranges from 1453, when Mantegna married Nicolosia Bellini, daughter Jacopo Bellini painter and the sister of Giovanni and Gentile, both painters as their father, and 1460 when he left for Mantua. Giovanni Bellini's Presentation at the Temple, explicitly inspired by Mantegna's, dates to around the latter year.

Description
The scene is set within a marble frame. The cushion on which the Child lies stands on it and partially juts out.

The Virgin Mary, in the foreground, is holding the Child while a bearded priest is near her. At the center, in penumbra, is Joseph with an aureola. Also in the background, at the sides, two spectators without aureola have been identified as possibly Mantegna's self-portrait and a portrait of his wife.

References 
La Grande Storia dell'Arte - Il Quattrocento, Il Sole 24 Ore, 2005
 Kleiner, Frank S. Gardner's Art Through the Ages, 13th Edition, 2008
 Manca, Joseph. Andrea Mantegna and the Italian Renaissance, 2006

 

1450s paintings
Paintings by Andrea Mantegna
Paintings in the Gemäldegalerie, Berlin
Mantegna